Bargah or Baregah may refer to:
 Bargah, East Azerbaijan
 Bargah, Kerman